Green Machine / Blue Space is the first solar hydrogen home. It was developed by  NYIT and  US Merchant Marine Academy. It is currently housed in US Merchant Marine Academy. It was built using a modified shipping container. It placed fifth in the Solar Decathlon.

See also 
 Alcoa Care-free Home, another experimental home in New York

References

United States Merchant Marine Academy
Houses in Nassau County, New York
Hydrogen production